The Municipality of Cerkvenjak is a municipality in northeastern Slovenia. The seat of the municipality is the settlement of Cerkvenjak. The municipality lies in the Slovene Hills in the region known as Prlekija. The area is part of the traditional region of Lower Styria. The municipality is now included in the Drava Statistical Region.

Settlements
In addition to the municipal seat of Cerkvenjak, the municipality also includes the following settlements:

 Andrenci
 Brengova
 Čagona
 Cenkova
 Cogetinci
 Grabonoški Vrh
 Ivanjski Vrh
 Kadrenci
 Komarnica
 Peščeni Vrh
 Smolinci
 Stanetinci
 Vanetina
 Župetinci

References

External links

Municipality of Cerkvenjak on Geopedia
Cerkvenjak municipal site

Cerkvenjak
1998 establishments in Slovenia